Trout River is a tributary of Chateauguay River, flowing in:
 the Adirondack Park, in Franklin County, New York, in Northern of New York State, in United States;
 the municipalities of Godmanchester and Elgin, in the Le Haut-Saint-Laurent Regional County Municipality, in the administrative region of Montérégie, in southwestern Quebec, Canada.

This valley is mainly served in Quebec by the route 138 which passes on the west side of the river (from the border), then on the northwest side going towards the mouth. In New York State, the nearby route is Constable Street and State Highway 30.

The river surface is generally frozen from mid-December to the end of March. Safe circulation on the ice is generally done from the end of December to the beginning of March. The water level of the river varies with the seasons and the precipitation.

Geography
This river originates in various rivers including the Little Trout River in the Adirondack Mountains located in upstate New York, United States.

Trout River, also called Rivière à la Truite in French, is a  non-navigable and non-buoyant river: it has only  of drainage basin that flows between the townships of Elgin and Godmanchester in front of lots granted by the Crown prior to June 1, 1884.

This private basin is owned by local residents (private watercourses: article 919. second paragraph, of the Civil Code of Quebec). The property extends to the river bed to the center (or better up to the water): which gives the right to fish and use the bottom in front of the properties (use: article 981. of Civil Code of Quebec). But private rights to the river must also respect those of others: because it is a kind of common property. There would be a legal right of way on private waterways so that people cannot be prevented from crossing the water. It is a municipal watercourse (not navigable), it is under the control of the Quebec Municipal Code and the municipality which can make regulations.

Trout River has two dams: the St-Onge Dam located in the hamlet of Trout River in Elgin near the Canada–US border. The other dam is the Hooker Dam, which is located between the hamlet of Kensington in Godmanchester and the path of the second concession to Elgin. The Trout River flows into the Chateauguay River just south of the town of Huntingdon. The municipality of Huntingdon set up a Route 138 rest stop at the confluence of the two rivers.

  north to Moody Road, then northwest to the north limit of Adirondack Park;
  towards the north-west, forming a large curve towards the north-east, crossing the Brainardsville Road and the Donohue Road, then turns west by cutting the Burke City Road, until at highway 11;
  north-west until close to Constable Street, where the course of the river goes north by crossing the Town Line Road, then branches west towards the end of the segment, to Constable Street Bridge;
  northwest, first crossing County Highway 22, forming a few loops, then bending northeast to intersect State Highway 30, to the release of the Little Trout River (New York) (coming from the southeast);
  northerly, forming a large S and passing on the west side of Trout River State Forest, as well as more or less along State Highway 30 and crossing Stebbin Road and curving west at the end of the segment, up to the Canada-US border;

  towards the north by forming a big S in agricultural area and by forming a loop towards the east at the end of the segment and another towards the west, to the bottom of a loop, opposite a small hamlet (near the meeting point of route 138 and Montée Leblanc;
  towards the northeast, relatively in a straight line by forming a hook towards the north at the end of the segment, to the bottom of a loop which receives the Beaver stream (coming from the northeast Where is);
  towards the northeast by winding in two zones, passing on the north side of the hamlet Kelvingrove, by collecting the Pringle stream (coming from the west), until its confluence.

Toponymy
In Franklin County (NY, USA), this river is designated "Trout River", just like in Canada.

The Commission de toponymie du Québec formalized the name on September 22, 1976.

See also
Châteauguay River
Elgin, Quebec
Franklin County, New York
Godmanchester, Quebec
Huntingdon, Quebec
Le Haut-Saint-Laurent Regional County Municipality
Little Trout River
List of rivers of New York State
List of rivers of Quebec

References

Sources
Government of Quebec Quebec Ministry of the Environment, the public water service.

External links
La rivière Trout sur le site de la Commission de toponymie du Québec.

Rivers of Montérégie
Tributaries of the Saint Lawrence River
Le Haut-Saint-Laurent Regional County Municipality
Rivers of New York (state)
Rivers of Franklin County, New York
International rivers of North America